Dafnochori may refer to:

 Glyfada, Central Greece, aka Dafnochori, a community in the Tolofon municipal unit of Dorida, Phocis, Central Greece
 Mesiano, aka Dafnochori, a community in the Kilkis municipal unit of Central Macedonia, in the Balkans